Del A. Stoltenberg (April 17, 1935 – June 3, 2017) was an American football and track and field coach.
He served as the head football coach at Wayne State College in Wayne, Nebraska from 1969 to 1982.

References

External links
 

1935 births
2017 deaths
Peru State Bobcats football players
Wayne State Wildcats football coaches
People from Nebraska City, Nebraska
Players of American football from Nebraska